James Edward Buttersworth (1817–1894) was an English painter who specialized in maritime art and is considered among the foremost ship portraitists in the United States of the nineteenth century.  His paintings are particularly known for their meticulous detail, dramatic settings, and grace in movement.

Early life and education
Buttersworth was born in London, England in 1817 to a family of maritime artists. He studied painting with his father Thomas Buttersworth Jr., who was also noted for the genre.

Career
He moved to the United States around 1845 and settled in West Hoboken, New Jersey (now Union City, New Jersey), and also maintained a Brooklyn studio in 1854.  He returned to England in 1851 for the Race for the Hundred Pound Cup that took place on 22 August 1851.  His sketches and paintings of that yachting competition provide the definitive record of events in that benchmark season of sailing.

Buttersworth’s paintings of the 1893 Vigilant v. Valkyrie II Cup match were done one year before his death, completing the chronicling of America's Cup races by oil painting just before the advent of successful photographic imagery.  He was inducted into the America's Cup Hall of Fame in 1999.  About 600 of his pieces survive today, which are found in private collections and museums all over the United States, including New York, New Jersey, Connecticut, and Virginia, and have also been featured on the television series Antiques Roadshow.

Gallery

Notes

References
 "Ship, Sea and Sky: The Marine Art of James Edward Buttersworth."  American Heritage, July–August 1994 v45 n4 p104 (1)

External links

A Guide to James E. Butterworth’s Art
Gallery of James. E. Buttersworth art
The Mariners' Museum

1817 births
1894 deaths
Painters from London
19th-century English painters
English male painters
Artists from New Jersey
British marine artists
People from Union City, New Jersey
19th-century English male artists